Hayley Rebecca Simmonds (born 22 July 1988) is a British racing cyclist, who currently rides for UCI Women's Continental Team .

Career
Simmonds attended King's School, Worcester from 1999 until 2006. She studied Natural Sciences at Newnham College, Cambridge, and completed a doctorate in Experimental Chemistry at Gonville and Caius College, Cambridge in 2016. She was originally a rower at Cambridge, taking part in the 2009 reserve crew Boat Race, before switching to cycling in 2011.

In 2015, she won the British National Time Trial Championships, and in August 2015 she set a new British national 10 mile time record with a time of 19:46. Simmonds joined the  team in January 2016, however in June of that year she announced that she was leaving the team after struggling to find an efficient position on their Wilier Triestina time trial bicycles.

Major results
Source:

2013
 1st Pedalpushers Circuit Race League No. 4
 2nd Hog Hill Summer Series 9
 3rd Individual pursuit, British Universities & Colleges Sport Track Championships
2014
 RTTC National Time Trial Championships
1st 10-mile
1st 50-mile
2nd 25-mile
 East London Velo Hog Hill Summer Series
1st Races 2 & 4
 1st Individual pursuit, British Universities & Colleges Sport Track Championships
 10th Chrono des Nations
2015
 National Road Championships
1st  Time trial
10th Road race
 RTTC National Time Trial Championships
1st 25-mile
1st 100-mile
 1st Overall Holme Valley Wheelers Stage Race
1st Stage 3
 Redbridge CC Summer Series
1st Rounds 7 & 9
 British Universities & Colleges Sport Track Championships
1st Points race
1st Individual pursuit
 2nd National Hill Climb Championships
2nd Road race, British Universities & Colleges Sport Road Championships
 3rd Chrono Champenois
 8th Chrono des Nations
2016
 1st  Time trial, National Road Championships
 2nd Chrono des Nations
 6th Chrono Champenois
2017 
 2nd Taiwan KOM Challenge
 3rd National Hill Climb Championships
 3rd Overall Thüringen Rundfahrt der Frauen
1st Stage 3 
 3rd Chrono des Nations
 National Road Championships
4th Time trial
8th Road race
 4th Ljubljana–Domžale–Ljubljana TT
 9th Overall Emakumeen Euskal Bira
 10th Durango-Durango Emakumeen Saria
2018
 2nd Ljubljana–Domžale–Ljubljana TT
 Commonwealth Games
3rd  Time trial
10th Road race
 3rd Chrono Champenois
 8th Time trial, UEC European Road Championships
2019
 1st  National Hill Climb Championships
 2nd Time trial, National Road Championships
 3rd  Time trial, European Games
 4th Chrono Champenois
 4th Ljubljana–Domžale–Ljubljana TT
 6th Chrono des Nations
 7th Time trial, UEC European Road Championships
2021
 6th Time trial, National Road Championships

References

External links
 
 
 
 
 

1988 births
Living people
British female cyclists
Commonwealth Games medallists in cycling
Commonwealth Games bronze medallists for England
Cyclists at the 2018 Commonwealth Games
Cyclists at the 2019 European Games
European Games medalists in cycling
European Games bronze medalists for Great Britain
Sportspeople from Redditch
People educated at King's School, Worcester
Alumni of Newnham College, Cambridge
Alumni of Gonville and Caius College, Cambridge
21st-century British women
Medallists at the 2018 Commonwealth Games